Timea Bacsinszky was the defending champion but she lost in the first round against Barbora Záhlavová-Strýcová.
Italian player Roberta Vinci defeated 8th seed Julia Görges 6–3, 6–4 in the final.

Seeds

Draw

Finals

Top half

Bottom half

External links
 Main draw
 Qualifying draw

Luxembourg Open
Bgl Luxembourg Open - Singles
2010 in Luxembourgian tennis